Juan Carlos Sarnari (born January 22, 1942) is a former Argentine football midfielder/striker. He was born in Argentina. He scored 29 goals in the Copa Libertadores, making him the 6th-highest scoring player in Copa Libertadores history.

Playing career

Sarnari started his career at River Plate at the age of 17. In 1963 he spent a season with Huracán. He returned to River in 1964.

In 1966 Sarnari was selected to represent the Argentina national football team at the 1966 FIFA World Cup.

In 1967 Sarnari moved to Chile where he played for Universidad Católica and Universidad de Chile (football club), in 1973 Sanari moved to Colombia where he played for Independiente Medellín and Independiente Santa Fe. He won the 1975 league title with Santa Fe.

Managerial career

Sarnari has been the manager of several clubs in Colombia including Deportes Quindío, Independiente Santa Fe and Once Caldas.

Life after football

Sarnari resides in Bogotá, Colombia.

Honours
Independiente Santa Fe
Categoría Primera A: 1975

References

1942 births
Living people
Argentine footballers
Association football forwards
Club Atlético River Plate footballers
Club Atlético Huracán footballers
Club Deportivo Universidad Católica footballers
Universidad de Chile footballers
Independiente Medellín footballers
Independiente Santa Fe footballers
Argentina international footballers
Argentine Primera División players
Argentine expatriate footballers
Expatriate footballers in Chile
1966 FIFA World Cup players
Place of birth missing (living people)
Argentine football managers
Independiente Santa Fe managers
Once Caldas managers
1967 South American Championship players
Pan American Games medalists in football
Pan American Games silver medalists for Argentina
Footballers at the 1963 Pan American Games
Medalists at the 1963 Pan American Games
Footballers from Santa Fe, Argentina